Zekkeishoku (絶景色; Scenery) is the first full-length album by Alice Nine and was released on April 26, 2006. Its limited version comes with a DVD, that contains an additional music video for the song "Fantasy".

Track listing 
 Corona (光環) – 5:11
 Velvet (ヴェルヴェット) – 5:15
 Fantasy – 5:27
 3.2.1.REAL -SE- – 1:09
 Haru, Sakura no Koro (春、さくらの頃; Spring, the Time of Cherry Blossoms) – 5:01
 Dead School Screaming – 3:49
 Kokkai no Kurage -Instrumental- (黒海の海月; Jelly Fish of the Black Sea) – 1:08
 Jelly Fish – 5:37
 World End Anthology (ワールドエンドアンソロジー) – 3:50
 Q. ("Question") – 2:48
 Kowloon – Nine Heads Rodeo Show- (九龍; Kowloon) – 4:38
 Armor Ring – 7:23

DVD
 Fantasy PV

References

2006 albums
Alice Nine albums
Alice Nine video albums
2006 video albums